The following radio stations broadcast on FM frequency 94.3 MHz:

Argentina
 Ángel in Puerto San Martín, Santa Fe
 LRM732 El Faro in Funes, Santa Fe
 Radio María in Libertador Gral San Martin, Jujuy
 Radio María in Villa Regina, Río Negro

Australia
 Rhema FM in Dubbo, New South Wales
 Radio National in Goondiwindi, Queensland
 Radio TAB in Gladstone, Queensland
 Radio TAB in Roma, Queensland
 3SEA in Latrobe Valley, Victoria

Brazil
 ZYD563 in Porto Alegre, Rio Grande do Sul
 ZYD577 in Santa Maria, Rio Grande do Sul

Canada (Channel 232)
 CBAF-FM-16 in Port au Port, Newfoundland and Labrador
 CBAL-FM-5 in Edmundston, New Brunswick
 CBHI-FM in Inverness, Nova Scotia
 CBKO-FM in Denare Beach, Saskatchewan
 CBLU-FM in Huntsville, Ontario
 CBTZ-FM in Kitwanga, British Columbia
 CFXE-FM in Edson, Alberta
 CHNW-FM in Winnipeg, Manitoba
 CHYZ-FM in Sainte-Foy, Quebec
 CIRX-FM in Prince George, British Columbia
 CISK-FM in Williams Lake, British Columbia
 CJBC-1-FM in Belleville, Ontario
 CJFH-FM in Woodstock, Ontario
 CJSD-FM in Thunder Bay, Ontario
 CJTW-FM in Kitchener/Waterloo, Ontario
 CKMF-FM in Montreal, Quebec
 CKSY-FM in Chatham, Ontario
 CKTT-FM in Timmins, Ontario
 VF2580 in Poplar River, Manitoba

China 
 CNR Business Radio in Wanzhou
 CNR Music Radio in Changchun, Hefei and Tiefengshan
 CNR The Voice of China in Tieling

India
 Radio One (India), in the whole of India
 My FM (Divya Bhaskar Group), in 30 selected cities of India
 Red FM, in Muzaffarpur, Bihar
 Tomato FM  Kolhapur Maharashtra(Pudhari Publication Pvt. Ltd)

Malaysia
 TraXX FM in Sandakan, Sabah

Mexico
 XHBTC-FM in Barroteran, Coahuila
 XHCAG-FM in Capilla de Guadalupe, Jalisco
 XHCAL-FM in Calpulalpan, Tlaxcala
 XHCJ-FM in Apatzingán, Michoacán
 XHCSAC-FM in Mapastepec, Chiapas
 XHEMG-FM in Arriaga, Chiapas
 XHGZ-FM in Zapotlán El Grande, Jalisco
XHJTA-FM in Irapuato, Guanajuato
XHPBLM-FM in Loma Bonita, Oaxaca
 XHPFRZ-FM in Fresnillo, Zacatecas
 XHPJON-FM in Jonuta, Tabasco
 XHPMAR-FM in Maravatío, Michoacán
XHPVJ-FM in Puerto Vallarta, Jalisco
XHQE-FM in Escuinapa, Sonora
XHTFO-FM in Teotitlán de Flores Magón, Oaxaca
XHVO-FM in San Rafael, Veracruz

Philippines

 FMR Baguio in Baguio City
 DWEC in Dagupan
 DWAN-FM in Puerto Princesa City
 FMR University FM in Nabua, Camarines Sur
 DWDF in Virac
 DYHT in Bacolod City
 DYIK in Tanjay, Negros Oriental
 DYTC-FM in Tacloban City
 DXIP in Ipil, Zamboanga Sibugay
 DXNE in Tubod, Lanao del Norte
 DXWZ in Cagayan De Oro City
 DXDA-FM in Digos
 DXMH in Mati
 DXTS in General Santos City
 DXJA in Midsayap

United Kingdom
 BBC Radio 4 from several locations

United States (Channel 232)
  in Rogers, Arkansas
  in California, Missouri
 KBPH-LP in Austin, Texas
  in Big Spring, Texas
  in San Fernando, California
 KCDR-LP in Austin, Texas
 KCMC-FM in Viola, Arkansas
  in Crescent City, California
 KCVW in Kingman, Kansas
 KDAM in Hartington, Nebraska
  in Chino Valley, Arizona
  in Deming, New Mexico
  in Makawao, Hawaii
 KDOM-FM in Windom, Minnesota
  in Barstow, California
  in Garden Grove, California
 KFST-FM in Fort Stockton, Texas
 KFYL-LP in La Grande, Oregon
 KGRB in Jackson, California
  in Crystal City, Texas
 KHKU in Hanapepe, Hawaii
 KHNA-LP in Sheridan, Wyoming
 KHSH-LP in Redlands, California
  in Colorado Springs, Colorado
 KJVA-LP in San Bernardino, California
  in Aitkin, Minnesota
  in Wellington, Colorado
 KMCQ-LP in Salem, Oregon
  in Kerman, California
 KOLK in Lakeside, Montana
 KPOP in Hartshorne, Oklahoma
 KRBN in Manton, California
 KRKZ-FM in Chinook, Washington
 KRRC-LP in Rogue River, Oregon
 KRVL in Kerrville, Texas
 KSAE-LP in Kennewick, Washington
 KSCM in Scammon Bay, Alaska
 KSEY-FM in Seymour, Texas
 KSHD-LP in Shady Cove, Oregon
 KSNA in Rexburg, Idaho
  in Hazelton, Idaho
 KTWI-LP in Liberal, Kansas
  in Alexandria, Minnesota
 KWDD in Fairbanks, Alaska
 KWVH-LP in Wimberley, Texas
  in Safford, Arizona
  in Elk City, Oklahoma
  in Roosevelt, Utah
 KXTM in Benavides, Texas
 KXVI-LP in Winfield, Texas
 KXYS-LP in Marysville, California
  in Alamogordo, New Mexico
 KYKM in Yoakum, Texas
  in Comanche, Texas
  in Ozona, Texas
 KZWL in Bullard, Texas
 KZZC-LP in Hope, Arkansas
 KZZR in Tillamook, Oregon
 WAWE in Glendale Heights, Illinois
  in Leland, Mississippi
  in Bennington, Vermont
  in Patton, Pennsylvania
 WCIH in Elmira, New York
  in Latta, South Carolina
 WCMV-FM in Leland, Michigan
  in Biddeford, Maine
 WERW in Monroe, Michigan
 WETH in Harrisonburg, Louisiana
  in Marathon, Florida
  in Waverly, Alabama
 WIFE-FM in Rushville, Indiana
  in Jenkins, Kentucky
  in Avalon, New Jersey
 WIJS-LP in Somerset, Kentucky
  in Cambridge, Maryland
 WIWU-LP in Marion, Indiana
  in Abbeville, Alabama
 WJJM-FM in Lewisburg, Tennessee
  in Asbury Park, New Jersey
  in Red Bank, Tennessee
  in Celina, Ohio
 WKKJ in Chillicothe, Ohio
 WKUF-LP in Flint, Michigan
  in Kingston, New York
  in Golconda, Illinois
 WKZW in Sandersville, Mississippi
 WLEL in Ellaville, Georgia
 WLLT in Polo, Illinois
 WLRF-LP in Binghamton, New York
 WLZV in Buckland, Virginia
  in Pana, Illinois
  in Marion, Ohio
  in Lake City, Florida
  in Powell, Tennessee
 WOWD-LP in Takoma Park, Maryland
  in Chillicothe, Illinois
  in Greencastle, Pennsylvania
 WQPC in Prairie du Chien, Wisconsin
 WQPJ-LP in Port Jervis, New York
 WQPN-LP in Miami, Florida
  in Greenville, Alabama
  in Greencastle, Indiana
  in Farmville, North Carolina
  in Fairmont, West Virginia
 WRLX in Riviera Beach, Florida
 WRMS-FM in Beardstown, Illinois
 WRND in Oak Grove, Kentucky
 WRQI in Saegertown, Pennsylvania
  in Goose Creek, South Carolina
  in Gibson, Georgia
  in Galliano, Louisiana
 WTJF-FM in Dyer, Tennessee
  in Staunton, Virginia
 WTRW in Carbondale, Pennsylvania
 WUDE in Forest Acres, South Carolina
  in Hardinsburg, Kentucky
 WVRH in Norlina, North Carolina
 WWSK in Smithtown, New York
 WXMR-LP in Marengo, Illinois
  in Corinth, Mississippi
  in New Haven, Connecticut
 WYDR in Neenah-Menasha, Wisconsin
  in Brewster, Massachusetts
  in Wallace, North Carolina
  in Norway, Michigan
  in Plymouth, Indiana

References

Lists of radio stations by frequency